Vårsta is a suburb of Greater Stockholm and a locality situated in Botkyrka Municipality, Stockholm County, Sweden with 2,396 inhabitants in 2010.

References 

Stockholm urban area
Populated places in Botkyrka Municipality
Södermanland